This is a list of Members of Parliament elected in the 1962 Northern Ireland general election.

All members of the Northern Ireland House of Commons elected at the 1962 Northern Ireland general election are listed.

Members

Changes
6 December 1962: William Kennedy of the Ulster Unionist Party replaced Joseph Morgan in Belfast Cromac.
1964: Harry Diamond and Gerry Fitt become founder members of the Republican Labour Party.
9 May 1964: Samuel Magowan of the Ulster Unionist Party replaced Brian Maginess in Iveagh.
30 June 1964: Austin Currie of the Nationalist Party replaced Joseph Stewart in East Tyrone.
3 December 1964: Basil Kelly of the Ulster Unionist Party replaced John L. O. Andrews in Mid Down.
19 June 1965: John Dobson of the Ulster Unionist Party replaced David John Little in West Down.

References
Biographies of Members of the Northern Ireland House of Commons

1962